Evergestis is a genus of moths of the family Crambidae described by Jacob Hübner in 1825. A number of species are pests, including the cross-striped cabbageworm (E. rimosalis), a pest of cole crops such as cabbage.

Species

Evergestis aegyptiacalis Caradja, 1916
Evergestis aenealis (Denis & Schiffermüller, 1775)
Evergestis africalis (Guenée, 1854)
Evergestis albifasciaria Chen & Wang, 2013
Evergestis albifuscalis (Hampson, 1900)
Evergestis alborivulalis (Eversmann, 1843)
Evergestis anartalis (Staudinger, 1892)
Evergestis angustalis (Barnes & McDunnough, 1918)
Evergestis anticlina Munroe, 1959
Evergestis antofagastalis Munroe, 1959
Evergestis arcuatalis (Hampson, 1900)
Evergestis aridalis Barnes & McDunnough, 1914
Evergestis atrapuncta Maes, 2011
Evergestis borregalis Munroe, 1974
Evergestis boursini Amsel, 1939
Evergestis brunnea Munroe, 1959
Evergestis caesialis (Herrich-Schäffer, [1849])
Evergestis comstocki Munroe, 1974
Evergestis consimilis Warren, 1892
Evergestis desertalis (Hübner, 1813)
Evergestis dilutalis (Herrich-Schäffer, 1848)
Evergestis dischematalis Munroe, 1995
Evergestis dognini Hampson, 1918
Evergestis dumerlei Leraut, 2003
Evergestis dusmeti Agenjo, 1955
Evergestis eurekalis Barnes & McDunnough, 1914
Evergestis exoticalis (Snellen, 1875)
Evergestis extimalis (Scopoli, 1763)
Evergestis forficalis (Linnaeus, 1758) – garden pebble 
Evergestis frumentalis (Linnaeus, 1761)
Evergestis fulgura (Cerf, 1933)
Evergestis funalis (Grote, 1878)
Evergestis holophaealis (Hampson, 1913)
Evergestis hordealis Chrétien, 1915
Evergestis hyrcanalis Amsel, 1961
Evergestis infirmalis (Staudinger, 1870)
Evergestis inglorialis Hampson, 1918
Evergestis insiola (Dyar, 1925)
Evergestis isatidalis (Duponchel, 1833)
Evergestis junctalis Warren, 1892
Evergestis koepckei Munroe, 1959
Evergestis laristanalis Amsel, 1961
Evergestis lichenalis Hampson, 1900
Evergestis limbata (Linnaeus, 1767)
Evergestis lunulalis Barnes & McDunnough, 1914
Evergestis lupalis Zerny, 1928
Evergestis marionalis Leraut, 2003
Evergestis marocana (D. Lucas, 1956)
Evergestis merceti Agenjo, 1933
Evergestis mimounalis (Oberthür, 1922)
Evergestis montis Maes, 2011
Evergestis mundalis (Guenée, 1854)
Evergestis nolentis Heinrich, 1940
Evergestis nomadalis (Lederer, 1870)
Evergestis obliqualis (Grote, 1883)
Evergestis obscuralis (Hampson, 1912)
Evergestis osthelderi (Schawerda, 1932)
Evergestis pallidata (Hufnagel, 1767)
Evergestis palousalis Munroe, 1974
Evergestis pechi (Bethune-Baker, 1885)
Evergestis perobliqualis Hampson in Elwes, Hampson & Durrant, 1906
Evergestis placens (Walker, [1866])
Evergestis plumbofascialis (Ragonot, 1894)
Evergestis politalis (Denis & Schiffermüller, 1775)
Evergestis rimosalis (Guenée, 1854)
Evergestis russulatalis (Hampson, 1900)
Evergestis scopicalis Hampson, 1908
Evergestis segetalis (Herrich-Schäffer, 1851)
Evergestis serratalis (Staudinger, 1870)
Evergestis sexmaculosus Matsumura, 1925
Evergestis simulatilis (Grote, 1880)
Evergestis sophialis (Fabricius, 1787)
Evergestis spiniferalis (Staudinger, 1900)
Evergestis subfuscalis (Staudinger, 1870)
Evergestis subterminalis Barnes & McDunnough, 1914
Evergestis triangulalis Barnes & McDunnough, 1914
Evergestis umbrosalis (Fischer von Röslerstamm, 1842)
Evergestis unimacula (Grote & Robinson, 1867)
Evergestis vinctalis Barnes & McDunnough, 1914

Former species
Evergestis flavicinctalis Snellen, 1890
Evergestis terminalis (Mabille, 1880)

Status unclear
Evergestis bilinealis

Gallery

References

 , 2011: New Crambidae from the Afrotropical region (Lepidoptera: Pyraloidea: Crambidae). Lambillionea 111 (3) Tome 1: 241–248.
 , 1998: The Scopariinae and Heliothelinae stat. rev. (Lepidoptera: Pyraloidea: Crambidae) of the Oriental Region- a revisional synopsis with descriptions of new species from the Philippines and Sumatra. Nachrichten des entomologischen Vereins Apollo 17 Suppl.: 475–528.
 , 2005: Revision of Evergestis anartalis (Staudinger, 1892) comb. rev. from Central Asia (Pyraloidea: Crambidae: Evergestinae). Nota Lepidopterologica 28 (1): 17–23. Full article: .

External links
 

Evergestinae
Moth genera
Taxa named by Jacob Hübner